UFC Fight Night: Santos vs. Ankalaev (also known as UFC Fight Night 203 and UFC on ESPN+ 61 or UFC Vegas 50) was a mixed martial arts event produced by the Ultimate Fighting Championship that took place on March 12, 2022 at the UFC Apex facility in Enterprise, Nevada, part of the Las Vegas Metropolitan Area, United States.

Background
A light heavyweight bout between former UFC Light Heavyweight Championship challenger Thiago Santos and Magomed Ankalaev served as the event headliner.

A featherweight bout between Joshua Culibao and Damon Jackson was scheduled for the event. However, Culibao was pulled from the event for undisclosed reasons and was replaced by Kamuela Kirk.

Former KSW Women's Flyweight Champion Ariane Lipski and JJ Aldrich were scheduled to meet in a women's flyweight bout. However, Lipski was removed due to undisclosed reasons and replaced by Gillian Robertson.

Mandy Böhm was scheduled to meet Sabina Mazo in a women's flyweight bout at the event. However, Böhm withdrew from the bout due to undisclosed reasons and was replaced by Miranda Maverick.

A lightweight bout between Ricky Glenn and Drew Dober was expected to take place at the event. However, a week before the event, Glenn withdrew due to a torn groin and was replaced by Terrance McKinney.

Results

Bonus awards
The following fighters received $50,000 bonuses.
Fight of the Night: No bonus awarded.
 Performance of the Night: Song Yadong, Khalil Rountree Jr., Cody Brundage, and Azamat Murzakanov

See also 

 List of UFC events
 List of current UFC fighters
 2022 in UFC

References 

UFC Fight Night
2022 in mixed martial arts
March 2022 sports events in the United States
2022 in sports in Nevada
Mixed martial arts in Las Vegas
Sports competitions in Las Vegas